Celestino is both a surname and a given name. Notable people with the name include:

Anthony Celestino, the touring bassist for the Blink-182 side project, Box Car Racer
Celestino Alfonso (1916–1944), Spanish republican and volunteer in the French liberation army
Celestino Bonifacio Bacalé, Equato-Guinean politician of the Convergence for Social Democracy (CPDS)
Celestino Caballero, professional boxer from Panama
Celestino Cavedoni (1795–1865), Italian ecclesiastic, archæologist, and numismatist
Celestino Corbacho (born 1949), Spanish politician, Minister of Labour and Immigration
Celestino Migliore (born 1952), Italian archbishop of the Roman Catholic Church
Celestino Mukavhi (born 1972), Zimbabwean sculptor
Celestino Piatti, Swiss graphic artist, painter and book designer
Celestino Rocha da Costa (born 1937), former prime minister of São Tomé and Príncipe
Celestino Rosatelli (1885–1945), Italian aeronautics engineer
Celestino Sfondrati (born 1644), Italian Benedictine theologian, Prince-abbot of St. Gall and Cardinal
Celestino Soddu, architect and professor of Generative Design at Politecnico di Milano university in Italy
Gilberto Celestino (born 1999), Dominican baseball player
Jaime Celestino Dias Bragança (born 1983), Portuguese football player
José Celestino Mutis (1732–1808), Spanish botanist and mathematician
Mirko Celestino (born 1974), Italian former professional road racing cyclist
Pedro Celestino Negrete (1777–1846), Spanish general in New Spain and later provisional president of Mexico
Pedro Celestino Silva Soares (born 1987), Cape Verdean football player
Rafael Celestino Benítez (1917–1999), highly decorated submarine commander